Beach Heat: Miami is an American dramedy television series set in Miami Beach, Florida. The show is fashioned after Baywatch and showcases the professional and personal lives of a motley crew of lifeguards. The show was shot exclusively in South Florida and lasted two seasons, with entirely different casts in each.

Cast
Christina Galioto as Lt. Melanie Harper (season 1)
Kristen Hinton as Brooke Jordan (season 1)
Josh Randall as Cale (season 1)
Tristian Lier as Chloe (season 1)
Tina Jordan as Lana (season 1)
Megan Hauserman as Amber (season 1) 
Chastity Lynn as Cassidy Romano (season 2)
Romeo Price as Christian Fletcher (season 2)
Kiara Mia as Ariel Drake (season 2)
Kevin Spencer as Jordan Whitcome (season 2)
Pepper Kester as Haley Walker (season 2)
Savannah Stern as Roxanne Riley (season 2)
Nick Manning as Jack Foster (season 2)

Episodes

Season 1: 2010

Season 2: 2011–12

External links
 
 

2010s American comedy-drama television series
2010 American television series debuts
2012 American television series endings
Beaches in fiction
English-language television shows
Erotic television series
Showtime (TV network) original programming
Television shows set in Miami
Works about lifeguards
Television series by CBS Studios